This list is of the Historic Sites of Japan located within the Prefecture of Kōchi.

National Historic Sites
As of 1 July 2019, twelve Sites have been designated as being of national significance.

Prefectural Historic Sites
As of 1 May 2018, thirty-one Sites have been designated as being of prefectural importance.

Municipal Historic Sites
As of 1 May 2018, a further three hundred and thirty-five Sites have been designated as being of municipal importance.

See also
 Cultural Properties of Japan
 Tosa Province
 List of Cultural Properties of Japan - paintings (Kōchi)
 List of Places of Scenic Beauty of Japan (Kōchi)

References

External links
  Cultural Properties in Kōchi Prefecture

Kōchi Prefecture
 Kochi